Mohammad Shah Razen bin Said (born 14 December 1985) is a Bruneian professional footballer who plays as a striker for Kasuka FC and the Brunei national team. He is the current record goalscorer for Brunei with eight goals.

Shah Razen is included in the International Federation of Football History & Statistics' all-time Brunei Men's Dream Team first eleven that was announced in August 2021.

Club career

Besides DPMM, Shah Razen has also played for AH United, non-league Viva Rangers, Wijaya FC, as well as a short trial with Indian club Sporting Clube de Goa. He was also Brunei's top scorer in the 2006-07 Malaysia Super League with 21 goals, back when DPMM were playing in the Malaysian Premier League. When DPMM joined the S.League starting in 2009, Shah Razen helped the club to win the Singapore League Cup twice, in 2009 and 2012. He was used sparingly by Steve Kean in the 2014 campaign, only starting two games and notching two goals as the team won the League Cup for the third time and only missing out on the S.League title in the final round of fixtures.

In the 2014 close season, he was poised to join Perak FA, which would have linked him up with former manager Vjeran Simunić who was then the Perak FA manager. The move did not materialise.

On 10 June 2021, Shah Razen stated in an Instagram post that the upcoming 2021 Brunei Super League season would be his last one in DPMM stripes. He made his first appearance of the season against Rimba Star FC on 4 July, coming on to replace Andrey Varankow. He managed to get a hat-trick to contribute to a 15–0 victory. This was his first hat-trick since 14 February 2007 against NS Naza in the 2006–07 Malaysia Super League.

On 4 December 2022, Shah Razen scored the winning goal in a 2–1 victory over Kasuka FC in the final of the 2022 Brunei FA Cup, to end a remarkable season in which he scored a total of 19 goals in the competition. 

Shah Razen ended his 17-year stay at DPMM in 2023 and joined Kasuka, reuniting him with his brother Adi. He scored on his debut in the opening match of the 2023 Brunei Super League on 3 March against MS PPDB which finished 4–0.

International career
After turning out for the host nation in the 2005 Hassanal Bolkiah Trophy with the Under-21s and the 2008 Sukma Games with the Under-23s, Shah Razen's first involvement with Skuad Tebuan came in November 2008, when the team was represented by his club DPMM for the 2008 AFF Suzuki Cup qualification in Cambodia. He scored 17 minutes into his debut against the Philippines on 19 October, followed by a brace against Timor-Leste two days later. However, Brunei failed to qualify for the tournament proper.

Shah Razen prominently featured over the next three qualifying campaigns in 2012, 2014 and 2016. He scored a penalty in a 4–0 win over Timor-Leste at the 2016 AFC Solidarity Cup held in Kuching, Malaysia. He also opened the scoring in the competition's semi-final stage against Macau but the game eventually finished 1–1. Despite putting away his spot-kick, Brunei crashed out 4–3 in penalties. He scored two goals and became the leading goalscorer for Brunei in the 3-2 loss against Laos in the resulting third-place play-off. At the conclusion of the inaugural tournament, he was awarded the tournament's top scorer with four goals and one assist to his name.

In September 2018, Shah Razen was selected for the two-legged 2018 AFF Suzuki Cup qualifying matches against Timor-Leste. He started both games as Brunei failed to advance to the competition proper, losing 2-3 on aggregate.

The following year, Shah Razen accepted another national team callup for the 2022 World Cup qualification matches against Mongolia to be held home and away in June. He was played in central midfield by Robbie Servais for both matches. Despite his and the team's collective efforts, the Wasps were eliminated from the 2022 World Cup and also the 2023 AFC Asian Cup by virtue of a 2-3 aggregate loss.

International goals

Honours

DPMM
 S.League: 2015
 Singapore Premier League: 2019
 Singapore League Cup: 2009, 2012, 2014
 Brunei FA Cup: 2022

Individual
 2006–07 Malaysia Super League Golden Boot (21 goals)
 2016 AFC Solidarity Cup Top Scorer (4 goals)

Personal life

Shah Razen has four brothers who have represented Brunei, namely Adi, Amalul, Ahmad Hafiz and Hakeme Yazid. He also has four brothers who are yet to turn out for the national team: former Majra FC and Rimba Star players Abdul Azim and Amirul Sabqi, former Menglait FC player Amiruddin Nizam, former MS ABDB player Abdul Mateen.

References

External links 
 
 

Living people
Association football forwards
Bruneian footballers
Brunei international footballers
Wijaya FC players
DPMM FC players
1985 births
Singapore Premier League players